Cherchez l'idole (English title: The Chase) is a 1964 French-Italian film directed by Michel Boisrond.

Cast
 Dany Saval as Corinne
 Franck Fernandel as Richard
 Dominique Boschero as Vonny
 Christian Marin as Marcel
 Pierre Doris as The disk seller
 Jacques Dynam as The driver
 Franco Califano as The director

As themselves,
 Pierre Bellemare
 Harold Kay
 Claude Piéplu
 Sylvie Vartan
 Eddy Mitchell
 Les Chaussettes Noires
 Nancy Holloway
 Frank Alamo
 Jean-Jacques Debout
 Mylène Demongeot
 Charles Aznavour
 Johnny Hallyday

References

External links 
 

French musical comedy films
Italian musical comedy films
1964 films
1964 musical comedy films
Films directed by Michel Boisrond
Films set in the 1960s
Films set in Paris
Films shot in Paris
French black-and-white films
Italian black-and-white films
1960s French-language films
1960s Italian films
1960s French films